İzmir Institute of Technology (commonly referred to as İYTE) is a public research university in İzmir, Turkey. İYTE maintains a strong emphasis on the natural sciences and engineering and is the only institute of its kind in Turkey with a special focus on scientific research. İzmir Institute of Technology is often cited among Turkey's top universities.
The medium of instruction in all the departments of İYTE is English.

History and general information
Founded on July 11, 1992 in the Aegean city of İzmir, the main fields of study that can be accessed at the İzmir Institute of Technology are science and technology. Within these fields, the university's principal aims are to carry out research, education, production, publication and consultancy, among other things.

Organizations

Faculties and departments
İYTE has 16 academic departments, most of which are organized in three faculties. These departments are responsible for the undergraduate programs.

In addition to these, there are Department of Foreign Languages and Department of General Cultural Courses.

Graduate schools
The Graduate School of Engineering and Science is responsible for the postgraduate programs in IZTECH.

İzmir Technology Development Zone

Connection to the airport, seaport, and to the organised industrial districts is provided by the İzmir-Çeşme Highway.

Criticism
IYTE is widely known for being a selective and difficult university. Students often drop out early or take a longer time than normal to complete their studies. Especially, in Faculty of Engineering, only half of the students can graduate from programs in their regular time.

See also
 Institute of technology
 Gebze Technical University
 List of universities in İzmir

References

 
Technical universities and colleges in Turkey
Engineering universities and colleges in Turkey
Institutes of Technology in Turkey
Educational institutions established in 1992
1992 establishments in Turkey
Universities and colleges in İzmir